Sino Gold Mining Limited or Sino Gold was a gold mining company headquartered in Sydney and conducting most of their mining operations in Jilin, Heilongjiang, Guizhou, and Shaanxi provinces in the People's Republic of China. In addition to being listed on the Australian Stock Exchange, they completed a listing on the Hong Kong Stock Exchange, with Morgan Stanley appointed as financial advisor early in its history. They were later acquired by Canadian mining group Eldorado Gold in 2009 for US 1.8 billion dollars.

See also
 Gold as an investment
 Gold mining in China
 Jinfeng Gold Mine

References

External links
 

Gold mining companies of Australia
Gold mining companies of China
Companies formerly listed on the Hong Kong Stock Exchange
Defunct companies of Australia
Companies established in 1995